Operation Amethyst was a Garda Síochána (police) operation targeting child pornography in the Republic of Ireland. Involving simultaneous searches on May 27, 2002 of over 100 individuals suspected of downloading child pornography, it was one of the largest police operations in Ireland's history.

Following a United States Postal Service investigation in the United States, details of 130 people were passed to the Garda Síochána.  The homes of over 100 suspected users of the site were raided , including several high-profile individuals including Circuit Court Judge Brian Curtin and celebrity chef Tim Allen.

References

 Anita Guidera, Ex-priest jailed on child porn charges, The Poynter Institute (Online), October 16, 2003.
 Cormac O’Keeffe, Nationwide swoop followed FBI tip-off , Irish Examiner, April 24, 2004.
 Crime.ie’s guide to the biggest and best gardaí operations'', Crime.ie, May 24, 2012
 Irish judge's home raided in porn swoop, News.telegraph, May 30, 2002.
 Child porn charges admitted, BBC News Europe, January 16, 2003.

2002 in the Republic of Ireland
Amethyst
Garda Síochána operations